Gerfaut was one of six s (contre-torpilleurs) built for the French Navy in the interwar period.

After France surrendered to Germany in June 1940 during World War II, Gerfaut served with the navy of Vichy France. She was among the ships of the French fleet scuttled at Toulon, France, on 27 November 1942.

Notes

References

 
 

World War II warships scuttled at Toulon
Aigle-class destroyers
1930 ships
Ships built in France
Maritime incidents in November 1942